Linda agnes Auma is a Ugandan politician and legislator, she represents the people of Lira district as woman member of parliament in the parliament of Uganda, which she entered on an independent ticket. Auma is the state minister for Gender and culture and the vice chairperson of the National women council. She is also the former Resident district commissioner (RDC) Of Amuru district.

Early life and education 
Auma is a daughter of the late major general David Oyite Ojok, a Uganda National Liberation Army (UNLA)chief of staff during the 2nd presidency of Dr Apollo Milton Obote.

Auma lost his father when she was 2 years old. Oyite Ojok perished in a helicopter accident in 1983 enroute a mission to assess the advancement of a guerilla rebel movement, National Liberation Army (NRA) led by Yoweri Kaguta Museveni, who later seized power in 1986.

Auma also lost her mother when she was 8 years old, which left her a total orphan and her early childhood and life was characterized by poverty and misery. Auma went to school with the help of well-wishers, and She had her firstborn daughter at the age of 16.

At the age of 26. Auma as a mother of 2 returned to school to complete her O'level education and her school fees were paid by president Yoweri Museveni, his father's former enemy.

She thereafter did a certificate course in accounting and enrolled for a diploma in business administration and later pursued a bachelor's degree in Business administration.

Career 
Auma entered into politics by contesting and becoming Lira municipal youth chairperson under the National youth council, she was later in 2006 elected the youth councillor for the central division in Lira municipal council.

In the 2016 she sought the Lira municipality Woman MP seat on the National Resistance Movement ticket but lost in the primaries. Joyce Ongom of the Uganda People's Congress (UPC) would win the MP seat.

After the 2016 Uganda general elections, Auma was appointed by president Museveni as RDC of Amuru district.

In the run to the 2021 Uganda general elections, Auma won Florence Angina in the NRM party primaries, but her victory was nullified after a vote recount.

Florence Angina was declared the NRM flag bearer for the Lira woman member of parliament seat, this prompted Auma to run as an independent candidate and was the eventual winner in the general elections.

In the parliament of Uganda, Auma serves on the committee on Environment and Natural resources. She also serves the publicity secretary of Uganda Women Parliamentary Association (UWOPA).

Personal life 
Aumas firstborn daughter Shakila Among Meenyi was crowned Miss Lira in 2017. She was also the face of Lango Cultural Heritage and was crowned Miss Tourism Northern Region in 2020. Shakila Among also represents the youth of Lira at Lira city council.

References 

Women members of the Parliament of Uganda
Members of the Parliament of Uganda
21st-century Ugandan women politicians
21st-century Ugandan politicians

Year of birth missing (living people)
Living people